The Opel Adam is a city car engineered and produced by the German car manufacturer Opel, and is named after the company's founder Adam Opel. It was sold under the Vauxhall marque in the United Kingdom. It was launched in France at the 2012 Paris Motor Show, with sales starting in the beginning of 2013.
 
On 10 October 2018, Opel and its British subsidiary, Vauxhall, announced that in order to optimise its model lineup and focus on high volume segments, the company would retire its Adam, Karl, Cascada and Viva models after the end of their life cycles, in approximately one year.

No successor model will replace the Adam, as the company announced intentions to focus on SUVs, notably a new Opel Mokka, as part of a strategy to increase company SUV sales from 25% to 40% by 2021. On 29 April 2019, the Opel and Vauxhall website configurator for new Adam cars was replaced by a list of available stock; production came to an end on 3 May 2019.

It was initially rumoured the model would be called the Allegra or Junior.

Overview

The car was available in three different trim levels and a wide choice of exterior colours, as well as three roof colours, different interior colours, decors and various headliners. The Adam is claimed to have over 61,000 combination possibilities for the exterior and over 82,000 for the interior. Production began at the Eisenach plant in Germany in January 2013, beside the Corsa.

The Adam is based on a shortened version of the Corsa D platform. The three door hatchback measures 3.70 metres in length and 1.72 metres in width, and seats four people.

Adam Rocks

To boost sales of the Adam, Opel launched a crossover convertible at the 2013 Geneva Motor Show named the Adam Rocks.

In February 2014, Vauxhall revealed its version of the Adam Rocks, ahead of the public debut at the Geneva Motor Show in March.

Awards 
The Opel Adam won the Red Dot Car Design Award in April 2013. In November 2012, Auto Zeitung readers in Germany voted for Opel Adam as the number one city car. In the 38th Readers’ Choice Award of the trade magazine Auto Motor und Sport, the car won the mini car category with 24.2 percent of the votes, beating the Volkswagen Up (23.9 percent) and the Mini (16.6 percent).

Engines 
From launch, there were a choice of two engines: 1.2 L 70PS (124 g/km ), and 1.4 L with 87 PS and 100 PS (129 g/km ). All engines are available in ecoFLEX mode with lower  emission, 1.2 ecoFLEX with 118 g/km and 1.4s with 119 g/km. From spring 2014, Opel introduced a 1.0 three cylinder SIDI Turbo engine.

Specifications

(Source: Opel Magazine)

Adam R2

Opel presented the study of the Adam R2 for the FIA Rally Regulations R2 at the 2013 Geneva Motor Show in Switzerland. It is largely based on the Adam Cup. Three cars were entered into the 2015 European Rally Championship.

Adam S

In 2014, Opel presented a road-legal sport version of the Adam R2 Rally Car – the Opel Adam S – powered by a 1.4 L turbocharged engine which generates 150 HP. The car makes 0–100 km/h in  8.5 seconds.

Sales 
Opel had planned to sell between 40,000 and 50,000 units a year in Europe, and sold over 45,000 in its first year, though sales were still in start up mode in the first two months of 2013. Year over year, sales increased every month in the first four months of 2014.

The Opel Adam was not sold in Denmark, Norway, Sweden, Turkey, Chile as well as in CIS countries. Singapore was one of the few markets outside Europe which sold the Opel Adam.

References

External links 

 Official Opel Adam Ireland website

Adam
City cars
Convertibles
Hatchbacks
2010s cars
Cars introduced in 2012
Front-wheel-drive vehicles
Euro NCAP superminis
Rally cars